The Okmulgee Drillers were a minor league baseball team that played in the Western Association from 1920 to 1927. They were based in Okmulgee, Oklahoma. In 1922, they played at Athletic Park, and from 1923 to 1927, they played at Petrolia Park.

Under managers Whitey Hensling and Ed Brennan in 1920, the Drillers went 83-46, finishing first in the standings. They tied for the league championship that season. In 1921, they had three or four different managers. One source says they were managed by Frank Herriott, Harry Womack and Johnny Wuffli, while another says Ed Klepfer managed them as well. They finished seventh in the standings that season, going 71-76. Under managers Wuffli and Troy Agnew in 1922, the Drillers finished fifth in the standings, going  56-79. They improved drastically in 1923 under manager Agnew, going 81-63 and finishing third in the league. They made it to the league finals, but lost. 

The Drillers' 1924 team is recognized as being the 49th greatest minor league team of all time. Under manager Agnew, they finished 110-48 that season, good for first in the league. They performed well in the postseason, winning the league championship. They were led offensively by Bud Davis and Cecil Davis, who hit .400 with 51 home runs and 190 RBI and .364 with 51 home runs and 162 RBI, respectively. Joe Bratcher hit .383 with 23 home runs and Bill Stellbauer hit .369 with 32 home runs as well. Their pitcher staff featured three twenty game winners: Guy Cantrell (21-7, 4.57 ERA), Jim Lyle (23-13, 3.97 ERA) and perhaps their best pitcher, Jim Walkup (23-3, 2.60 ERA). Wilcy Moore also went 17-6, and Walt Tauscher went 12-4. 

The Drillers would never again match the success they had in 1924. In 1925, they finished with an 80-71 record under managers Roy Corgan and Red Snapp, placing third in the league. Under Chick Mattick in 1926, they finished fourth in the league with a 73-85 record, and in 1927 they finished fifth in the league with a 57-75 record under manager Troy Agnew.

Notable players
Jack Mealey (born 1899) -- minor league baseball catcher, who also managed in the minor leagues and served as president of the Sooner State League

References

Defunct minor league baseball teams
Baseball teams established in 1920
Professional baseball teams in Oklahoma
Defunct baseball teams in Oklahoma
Defunct Western Association teams
Baseball teams disestablished in 1927